Vanato is a village in the municipal unit of Arkadioi on the island of Zakynthos, Greece. It is 4 km northwest of Zakynthos (city).

Populated places in Zakynthos